Hamhŭng station is a railway station in Yŏkchŏn 1-dong, Sŏngch'ŏngang-guyŏk, Hamhŭng city, South Hamgyŏng province, North Korea, located on the P'yŏngra Line of the Korean State Railway; it is also the starting point of the Sinhŭng Line and the Sŏho Line. A locomotive depot is located here, and there are spurs to the Hamhŭng Knitwear Factory and the Paekkŭmsan Combined Foodstuffs Factory in Haebit-tong, Sŏngch'ŏngang-guyŏk.

History 

The station was originally opened on 15 December 1919 by the Chosen Government Railway as part of the  Yŏnghŭng (nowadays Kŭmya)–Hamhŭng section of the Hamgyŏng Line.

References

Railway stations in North Korea